The 2017 European Wrestling Championships  was held in Novi Sad, Serbia, from 2 to 7 May 2017.

Medal table

Team ranking

Medal summary

Men's freestyle

 The winner of the silver medal in the 97 kg category, Anzor Boltukayev from Russia, was disqualified and deprived of the medal due to doping.

Men's Greco-Roman

Women's freestyle

Participating nations
403 competitors from 38 nations participated:

 (1)
 (16)
 (7)
 (23)
 (2)
 (24)
 (21)
 (4)
 (1)
 (7)
 (3)
 (6)
 (5)
 (7)
 (9)
 (16)
 (20)
 (10)
 (18)
 (6)
 (7)
 (6)
 (7)
 (14)
 (4)
 (1)
 (7)
 (18)
 (1)
 (14)
 (24)
 (1)
 (20)
 (5)
 (12)
 (6)
 (24)
 (24)

References

External links 
 Official Site
 Official Results

 
Europe
European Wrestling Championships
European Wrestling Championships
2017 European Wrestling Championships
Wrestling Championships
Sports competitions in Novi Sad
European Wrestling Championships
21st century in Novi Sad